Serial Joe was a Canadian band from Newmarket, Ontario which consisted of high school students Ryan Dennis (vocals, guitar), Ryan Stever (guitar), John Davidson (bass guitar), Dan Stadnicki (drums) and Jamie Fulcher (Back Up Vocals) . The group released four studio albums.

Dennis stated that the band's name came from a girl with a speech disorder who would mispronounce the name "Sergio" as "Serial-Joe".

History
They won the 1998 Much Music Video award for best independent video ("Skidrow", off their independent EP KICKeD), later becoming the house band on YTV's System Crash. 

In 1999, the band released their first studio album for Aquarius Records, Face Down, which peaked at No. 47 on the Canadian Albums Chart. The album's first single, "Mistake", gained international airplay.

The band won several awards, and performed at Woodstock 1999 in the "emerging artists" tent. 

In late 2001, Serial Joe released their final album Last Chance (At the Romance Dance), which showcased a more melodic pop/rock approach, in contrast to the band's earlier rap-influenced metal sound. Around 2002, they were dropped from their label and broke up shortly thereafter. Vocalist Ryan Dennis and guitarist Ryan Stever are now part of the hard rock group High Kapitol.

Awards
1998 "Skidrow": Much Music Video Award for Best Independent Video
1999 YTV Achievement Award for Best Band
1999 (Nominated) "Mistake": Much Music Video Award for Best Rock Video
2000 "Deep": Much Music Video FACT Award for Best Video (presented by Kiss members Paul Stanley and Gene Simmons during a tour with them)
2000 (Nominated) Much Music People's Choice Award for Best Canadian Band
2000 (Nominated) Juno Award for Best New Band
2000 (Nominated) Gemini Award for Best Specialty Show

Discography
KICKeD (1998)
Skidrow
Dream Girl
Velocity
Lonely Heart
Obsession
Welcome To Happyland

Face Down (1999) (Gold) 
Should Have Been Mine
Deep
Mistake
Face Down
Dragon On My Shoulder
Shallow
Push
Sanity
Centipede
Confused
Outrage
Denial

Serial Joe... (2000)
Silently Screaming
Out Of Hand
Absence Of Mind
What I See
Another Time
False Design
Mistake: USA Version
Face Down: My Brilliant Beast Mix
Should Have Been Mine: MetalDog Mix
Deep: MetalDog Mix
Absence of Mind: Jimi LaMort's Absinthe Mix
What I See: Malhavoc's "Help Please Send Bobo" Mix

(Last Chance) At the Romance Dance... (2001)
Completely
Angry
Unintended
Stranded
Mary
Turn Around
Suddenly
Girl Like You
You Don't Laugh
Go for a Ride
Committed
Save Me

References

External links

Musical groups from Newmarket, Ontario
Canadian punk rock groups
Canadian alternative metal musical groups
Canadian nu metal musical groups
Canadian post-grunge groups
1997 establishments in Ontario
Musical groups established in 1997